Prem Gali is a 2020 Pakistani romantic comedy television series that premiered on ARY Digital. It is written by Faiza Iftikhar, directed by Qasim Ali Mureed and produced by Humayun Saeed under Six Sigma Plus. It features Farhan Saeed and Sohai Ali Abro.

Plot
The story begins with a band of bachelors Hamza and his widowers elders includes; his grandfather, father Hatim and paternal uncle Luqman; shifting to their new home in a small, lively colony called Prem Gali. The moment Hamza steps in the neighborhood, his eyes land on the pretty Joya, and in a clichéd-turn-of-events, she becomes love at first sight for him. Meanwhile, Joya and her family too are residents of Prem Gali, but are considered infamous and notorious due to the streak of failed marriage running in the household. From her grandmother Rahat, mother Shireen to her maternal aunt Musarrat; all have been divorced yet are empowered and emotional in their ways. There is also a loud and shrewd landlord, Haseena who rents her upper floor to Hamza and the men. While she also runs a marriage bureau, she has an unmarried daughter, Fariya who runs a beauty parlor inside their home.

The fun begins when families of Hamza and Joya encountered with each other. After so many attempts of Hamza, Joya falls in love with him. Both tries to convert their love marriage into arranged one as Joya's mother strongly opposes love marriages. Joya's mother came up with condition that she will accept 
the proposal of Hamza only if Hamza will stay with them as Ghar Damad (A man who lives with his wife`s parents), on which dispute happened. Later on Tau Hidyat came up to Shireen with solution that make Hamza's family your paying guest, she agreed and finally Joya and Hamza got married.

After marriage, Joya and Hamza, both got irritated by their families as they had to fight with the insecurities of their families. Joya's mother, grandmother and aunt used to give her totally different advices because they didn't want Joya to get divorced as they got, on the other hand Hamza's father, grandfather and uncle couldn't even stand the sneeze of Joya because they didn't want Joya to die as their wives died. Then Joya and Hamza got irritated to face the insecurities and experiments of their families and run away from their home. However Hamza's grandfather took them back by his fake heart attack plan.

Later on, the sweet bickering started between Musarrat and Luqman. Musarat, who had started living a happy life, Luqman fell in love with her. Luqman send his marriage proposal to her but she disagreed. However Luqman reassured her that she would always be happy. In the last episode, they got married.

Cast 
 Farhan Saeed as Hamza Hatim
 Sohai Ali Abro as Joya Hamza
 Anoushay Abbasi as Fariha a.k.a. Fari
 Javed Sheikh as Manzoor
Shahzad Sheikh as Young Manzoor / Shireen's Husband (flashback)
 Qavi Khan as Dada Jee
 Shamim Hilaly as Rahat 
 Saba Hameed as Shireen
Jinaan Hussain as Young Shireen (flashback)
 Waseem Abbas as Hatim Chaudhary
 Uzma Hassan as Musarrat
Abdullah Farhatullah as Luqmaan
 Farah Shah as Haseena
 Faiza Gillani as Nargis
 Fahima Awan as Dua / Hamza's aunt
 Zoya Nasir as Farzana / Hatim's wife
 Abdullah Farhatullah as Hamza's uncle
 Ashraf Khan as Tau Hidayat

Production

Background and development
After the success of 2017 dark comedy Aangan, the director Qasim Ali Mureed, writer Faiza Iftikhar and producer Humayun Saeed decided to re-unite for another project with light hearted comedy theme. They announced the Project in July 2019.

The Producer choose Saeed and Abro for lead roles making it their second on-screen collaboration together after De Ijazat Jo Tu. The producers also repeat some Aangan actors including Waseem Abbas, Qavi Khan and Uzma Hassan. Shooting started in December 2019. Decided to be premiered in early 2020, it was postponed to August 2020 amid COVID-19 outbreak due to some incompleted shoots.

Release
The first teaser of the show was released on 5 August 2020 featuring Farhan Saeed and Sohai Ali Abro while the second promo was released on 6 August 2020 featuring Shamim Hilaly, Saba Hameed, Farah Shah, Uzma Hassan, Qavi Khan, Waseem Abbas also.

Reception

Ratings

Awards and nominations

References 

2020 Pakistani television series debuts
Urdu-language television shows
ARY Digital original programming
Pakistani drama television series
Pakistani romantic drama television series